The 2000 Tostitos Fiesta Bowl, played on January 2, 2000, was the 29th edition of the Fiesta Bowl. The game was played at Sun Devil Stadium in Tempe, Arizona between the Tennessee Volunteers (ranked #5 in the BCS) and the Nebraska Cornhuskers (ranked #3 in the BCS). The matchup featured the two most current National Championship teams: Nebraska in 1997, and Tennessee in 1998. The teams first met two years earlier for the 1998 Orange Bowl.

Scoring Summary

1st Quarter

Nebraska – Dan Alexander 7 yard run (Josh Brown kick) 11:34 NEB 7 TN 0

Nebraska – Bobby Newcombe 60 yard punt return (Josh Brown kick) 3:21 NEB 14 TN 0

2nd Quarter

Nebraska – Josh Brown 31-yard field goal 1:37 NEB 17 TN 0

Tennessee – Donté Stallworth 9 yard pass from Tee Martin (Alex Walls kick) 0:18 NEB 17 TN 7

3rd Quarter

Tennessee – Travis Henry 4 yard run (Alex Walls kick) 13:03 NEB 17 TN 14

Nebraska – Aaron Golliday 13 yard pass from Eric Crouch (Josh Brown kick) 4:44 NEB 24 TN 14

4th Quarter

Nebraska – Correll Buckhalter 2 yard run (Josh Brown kick) 12:01 NEB 31 TN 14

Tennessee – Donte Stallworth 44 yard pass from Cedrick Wilson (Alex Walls kick) 7:25 NEB 31 TN 21

References

Fiesta Bowl
Fiesta Bowl
Nebraska Cornhuskers football bowl games
Tennessee Volunteers football bowl games
Fiesta Bowl
January 2000 sports events in the United States